Sacred Heart Apostolic School (SHAS) is a Roman Catholic minor seminary and a private, all-male boarding school in the United States for minors who are considering a vocation to the priesthood. It is located within the Diocese of Gary and operated by the Legionaries of Christ, a religious congregation of the Roman Catholic Church. The school is located in the north-central Indiana town of Rolling Prairie. It serves approximately 20–35 students enrolled in grades 7 through 12.  SHAS was established in 2005 and has operated continuously since.

History
The main building of the 51 acre campus was built in 1932-33 by the Congregation of Holy Cross. It was constructed as their novitiate and dedicated to St. Joseph. In 1968, they changed its use to an international boarding school called LeMans Academy. LeMans closed in 2003, and the property was divided before the Legion bought the main building in 2005.

Academics

The academic program follows a classical liberal arts model which emphasizes classical (Latin and Greek) and modern foreign languages, British and American literature, mathematics and the natural sciences, history, theology, cultural studies, and the fine arts (vocal music, theater arts, and communication). The Latin and Greek courses, in particular, encourage all students to be able to read Virgil's Aeneid in the original Latin and translate the Gospel of John from the original Greek by their senior year. The mathematics program begins with pre-algebra and extends to Trigonometry and Calculus with an emphasis on theory rather than application. Students are required to take Spanish as a modern foreign language. Each student is also required to participate in the school’s band and choir programs.

Spirituality

Religious practices such as the Holy Mass, the Rosary, and the Benediction of the Blessed Sacrament are provided regularly for the students. Students are introduced to Catholic spirituality, which takes different elements from various Christian spiritual authors.

The school also functions as a retreat center for boys and it hosts a month-long summer program for those who are interested in enrolling for the academic year.

See Also

References

External links
 Official Website of Sacred Heart Apostolic School

Catholic secondary schools in Indiana
Boarding schools in Indiana
Boys' schools in the United States
Schools in LaPorte County, Indiana
Educational institutions established in 2005
Catholic minor seminaries in the United States
Regnum Christi
Legion of Christ
Roman Catholic Diocese of Gary
2005 establishments in Indiana